Ronald Moran (28 February 1934 – 22 March 2017) was a Liverpool captain and coach who twice served as caretaker manager in the early 1990s.

Having spent his entire playing career at the club, he then became a member of the Boot Room coaching staff with Bill Shankly, Bob Paisley, Joe Fagan and Reuben Bennett, and was the club's longest-serving employee when he retired in 1998.

Moran died on 22 March 2017, at the age of 83.

Full-time player

Moran was born in Crosby, Liverpool, and began his footballing career at Liverpool playing with the 'C' team while working as an apprentice electrician. Originally a left back, Moran signed professional terms for manager Don Welsh in January 1952 and subsequently made his debut in a 3–2 defeat at Derby County on 22 November 1952, at the age of 18 years.

It was in season 1955–56 that Moran established himself as Liverpool's first choice number three. The Reds were languishing in the Second Division at this time but Moran, a good marker who was rarely beaten by a winger for pace and was also something of a penalty expert, proved himself a consistent performer missing only six games between 1955 and 1959.

He was rewarded for his service towards the latter part of the decade when he was handed the club captaincy. In 1961–62, after a lengthy spell on the sidelines, he played sixteen games as the Reds finally regained their top-flight status and two seasons later was part of the Division One Championship-winning side, missing only seven games all season.

Injury problems then began to set in and he missed out to Gerry Byrne for the left back slot in the 1965 FA Cup Final win over Leeds United. He did, however, play in the Anfield victory over Internazionale three days later, before playing his last competitive game in the San Siro stadium when Liverpool were controversially beaten in the second leg of the European Cup semi-final.

Transition to coaching

In 1966 Moran was invited onto the coaching staff by Bill Shankly though he continued playing for Joe Fagan's reserves for a further two years, helping to bring on the younger players.

Full-time coach

He formally retired from playing during the 1968–69 season and joined the coaching staff full-time, where he joined the Boot Room team of Shankly, Fagan, Bob Paisley and Reuben Bennett.

In 1971, he took charge of the reserve team and in 1972–73 guided the Reds' second string to the Central League Championship.

Moran, or Bugsy as he had become known, became a vital ingredient in the Liverpool success story with his shrewd knowledge of the game and the ability to get the best out of the players. In a spectacularly successful period for the club he was a fine, loyal servant working first under Shankly, Bob Paisley, Joe Fagan and then Kenny Dalglish, and later for Graeme Souness and Roy Evans.

In keeping with the Boot Room traditions he never sought the limelight, never promoted himself above his colleagues or the team. He became famous on the bench for his loud voice shouting instructions to the players which could be heard in the packed Kop.

When Dalglish sensationally announced his resignation as manager in February 1991, Moran was installed as caretaker boss, a role he occupied for only ten games. His first game in charge was a 3–1 defeat away to Luton Town on 23 February 1991. He had placed on record an unwillingness to take the job on full-time and summarily stood down when Graeme Souness was duly appointed as Dalglish's successor in April 1991.

In April 1992 Moran took over as caretaker again after Graeme Souness went in for heart surgery. Souness's first time back was 1992 FA Cup Final where he chose the team along with Moran. Moran had the honour of leading Liverpool out at Wembley for The Final. Souness returned to his full-time duties in July.

Moran remained on the coaching staff under Souness and then under friend Roy Evans when he took over as manager in January 1994. Evans became the ninth manager Moran had worked under at the club in one capacity or another in his near half century of dedicated service, the full list being: George Kay, Don Welsh, Phil Taylor, Bill Shankly, Bob Paisley, Joe Fagan, Kenny Dalglish, Graeme Souness, Roy Evans.

Ronnie Moran finally announced his retirement from football and left Liverpool in 1998. Along with Bob Paisley, he had filled every role imaginable at the club from player, to physio, to coach and trainer, through to manager, and kit man.

In March 2017, a book titled Mr Liverpool was released which detailed Moran's life at Liverpool FC.

Moran died on 22 March 2017, at the age of 83.

Honours

Player
Liverpool
Football League First Division (1): 1963–64
Football League Second Division (1): 1961–62
FA Charity Shield (1): 1964

References

External links
 LFC Online profile
 Player profile at LFChistory.net
 Manager profile at LFChistory.net
100 Players Who Shook The Kop – No.70

1934 births
2017 deaths
English footballers
Association football fullbacks
Liverpool F.C. players
Liverpool F.C. managers
Liverpool F.C. non-playing staff
Footballers from Liverpool
English Football League players
English Football League representative players
English football managers